Patnagarh is a town and a Notified Area Council in Bolangir district in the Indian state of Odisha. Its original name (with diacritics) is Patnāgarh, and it is pronounced verbally as Patnāgad. The official language is chattish garhi. Patnagarh bears historical significance as it was the epicentre of power in middle age. Patnagarh was the capital of 18 garh that come under south Koshal. In 12th century AD the progenies of the famous King of Delhi, Prithwiraj Chouhan came and settled down in Patnagarh. They came here because Mohammad Ghori defeated Prithwiraj Chowhan in 2nd battle of Tarai in 1193. The first child of the royal scion who ruled Patnagarh as per recorded history was Ramai Deo. However after 16th century onwards when Balangir and Sambalpur came in to being the city lost its charm.

Geography
It has an average elevation of 243 metres (797 feet). Patnagarh is one of the towns in Patnagarh Tehsil, Balangir District, Odisha State.

Demographics
 India census, Patnagarh had a population of 45445. Males constitute 51% of the population and females 49%. Patnagarh has an average literacy rate of 67%, higher than the national average of 59.5%: male literacy is 76%, and female literacy is 57%. In Patnagarh, 11% of the population is under 6 years of age.

Politics
Current MLA from Patnagarh Assembly Constituency is Saroj Meher of Biju Janata Dal, who won the seat in State elections in 2019 defeating 5 times MLA Kanak Vardhan Singh Deo. Previous MLAs from this seat were Bibekandanda Meher who won this seat representing JD in 1990 and representing JNP in 1977, Sushil Kumar Prushty of INC in 1985, and Brajamohan Thankur of INC(I) in 1980.

Patnagarh is part of Bolangir (Lok Sabha constituency).

Education
The city has good educational institutions, such as Jawaharlal College (co -edu),
Ramai boys high school,
Govt. girls high school,
Govt. girls school,
Govt. boys school,
C.T training school,
Lions Vocational public school,
Saraswati shishu vidya mandir,
Odisha State Brigade School,
Sri Aurobindo Integral Education Centre
Omm International School
Vidyashree Vidyapeeth
Vidya vikash Academy
And other Primary schools are also present. It has a Sub-divisional Jail too.

Notable people
 
 Bhajju Shyam, artist.
 Subroto Bagchi, entrepreneur, author.

See also
 Patnagarh bombing

References

Cities and towns in Bolangir district